Holtermann is a surname. Notable people with the surname include: 

Bernhardt Holtermann (1838-1885), German gold miner in Australia
Hans Reidar Holtermann (1895-1966), Norwegian army officer
Henrik Holtermann (born 1998), Danish curler.
Ove Bjelke Holtermann (1852–1936), Norwegian architect, uncle of Hans Reidar
Peter Høier Holtermann (1820–1865), Norwegian architect, uncle of Ove Bjelke and granduncle of Hans Reidar